Cassander (c. 355 BC – 297 BC) was king of the Ancient Greek kingdom of Macedonia from 305 BC until 297 BC, and de facto ruler of southern Greece from 317 BC until his death.

A son of Antipater and a contemporary of Alexander the Great, Cassander was one of the Diadochi who warred over Alexander's empire following the latter's death in 323 BC. Cassander later seized the crown by having Alexander's son and heir Alexander IV murdered. In governing Macedonia from 317 BC until 297 BC, Cassander restored peace and prosperity to the kingdom, while founding or restoring numerous cities (including Thessalonica, Cassandreia, and Thebes); however, his ruthlessness in dealing with political enemies complicates assessments of his rule.

Early history
In his youth, Cassander was taught by the philosopher Aristotle at the Lyceum in Macedonia. He was educated alongside Alexander the Great in a group that included Hephaestion, Ptolemy and Lysimachus. His family were distant collateral relatives to the Argead dynasty.

Cassander is first recorded as arriving at Alexander the Great's court in Babylon in 323 BC, where he had been sent by his father, Antipater, most likely to help uphold Antipater's regency in Macedon, although a later contemporary who was hostile to the Antipatrids suggested that Cassander had journeyed to the court to poison the King.

Later history

As Antipater grew close to death in 319 BC, he transferred the regency of Macedon not to Cassander, but to Polyperchon, possibly so as not to alarm the other Diadochi through an apparent move towards dynastic ambition, but perhaps also because of Cassander's own ambitions. Cassander rejected his father's decision, and immediately went to seek the support of Antigonus, Ptolemy and Lysimachus as his allies. Waging war on Polyperchon, Cassander destroyed his fleet, put Athens under the control of Demetrius of Phaleron, and declared himself Regent in 317 BC. After Olympias’ successful move against Philip III later in the year, Cassander besieged her in Pydna. When the city fell two years later, Olympias was killed, and Cassander had Alexander IV and Roxane confined at Amphipolis.

Cassander associated himself with the Argead dynasty by marrying Alexander's half-sister, Thessalonike, and he had Alexander IV and Roxanne poisoned in either 310 BC or the following year. By 309 BC, Polyperchon began to claim that Heracles was the true heir to the Macedonian inheritance, at which point Cassander bribed him to have the boy killed. After this, Cassander's position in Greece and Macedonia was reasonably secure, and he proclaimed himself king in 305 BC. In 307–304 BC he fought the so-called Four–Years' War against Athens. In 304 BC, his rival Antigonus Monophthalmus sent his son Demetrius Poliorcetes to aid Athens against Cassander. Demetrius succeeded in driving Cassander from central Greece and created a Hellenic League, the League of Corinth, against him. In the winter of 303–302 BC, Cassander opened negotiations with Antigonus with a view to establish peace, but Antigonus refused. At this Cassander turned to Lysimachus, Ptolemy, and Seleucus and convinced them to reform the coalition of 314–311 against Antigonus. In early 302 BC, Cassander sent one of his generals, Prepelaus, with an army from Macedon to join Lysimachus in an invasion of Antigonus's territory in Asia-Minor. Cassander himself marched with the main Macedonian field army into Thessaly to stop Demetrius from advancing into Macedon. Demetrius invaded Thessaly with a numerically superior force, Cassander stopped his advance by refusing to give battle and fortifying his positions. Lysimachus and Prepalaus had been very successful in Asia-Minor and Seleucus was marching with an army to join them. In the spring of 302 BC, Antigonus marched with an army from Syria into Asia-Minor to confront his enemies; he confronted Lysimachus and drove him from Phrygia. Antigonus realizing that the war would probably have to be decided in a major battle in Asia-Minor recalled Demetrius from Thessaly. With Demetrius gone Cassander sent part of his army with his brother, Pleistarchus, to join Prepalaus, Lysimachus and Seleucus in Asia-Minor. In 301 BC, the combined armies of Lysimachus, Seleucus, Prepalaus and Pleistarchus faced the combined armies of Antigonus and Demetrius at Ipsus. After the Battle of Ipsus in which Antigonus was killed, Cassander was undisputed in his control of Macedon; however, he had little time to savour the fact, dying of dropsy in 297 BC.

Cassander's dynasty did not live much beyond his death, with his son Philip dying of natural causes, and his other sons Alexander and Antipater becoming involved in a destructive dynastic struggle along with their mother. When Alexander was ousted as joint king by his brother, Demetrius I took up Alexander's appeal for aid and ousted Antipater, killed Alexander V and established the Antigonid dynasty. The remaining Antipatrids, such as Antipater II Etesias, were unable to re-establish the Antipatrids on the throne.

Legacy 
Cassander stood out amongst the Diadochi in his hostility to Alexander's memory. As Cassander and the other diadochi struggled for power, Alexander IV, Roxana, and Alexander's supposed illegitimate son Heracles were all executed on Cassander's orders, and a guarantee to Olympias to spare her life was not respected. 

Cassander's decision to restore Thebes, which had been destroyed under Alexander, was perceived at the time to be a snub to the deceased King. It was later even said that he could not pass a statue of Alexander without feeling faint. Cassander has been perceived to be ambitious and unscrupulous, and even members of his own family were estranged from him.

Of more lasting significance was Cassander's refoundation of Therma into Thessalonica, naming the city after his wife. Cassander also founded Cassandreia upon the ruins of Potidaea.

Notes

References 
Diodorus Siculus, Bibliotheca chapters xviii, xix, xx
Green, Peter, Alexander the Great and the Hellenistic Age, Weidenfeld & Nicolson, 2007.  
 Richard A. Billows, Antigonos the One-Eyed and the Creation of the Hellenistic State, University of California Press, Berkeley and Los Angeles, California, 1990. 
Plutarch, Parallel Lives, "Demetrius", 18, 31; "Phocion", 31
Franca Landucci Gattinoni: L'arte del potere. Vita e opere di Cassandro di Macedonia. Stuttgart 2003.

External links
A genealogical tree of Cassander

350s BC births
297 BC deaths
4th-century BC Macedonian monarchs
3rd-century BC Macedonian monarchs
4th-century BC viceregal rulers
Ancient Macedonian generals
Hellenistic generals
Regents of Macedonia (ancient kingdom)
Conspirators against Alexander the Great
Ancient Thessalonica
Deaths from edema
3rd-century BC rulers
4th-century BC rulers
4th-century BC Greek people
3rd-century BC Greek people
Hellenistic rulers
Antipatrid dynasty